Barton J. Bernstein (born 1936) is Professor emeritus of History at Stanford University and co-chair of the International Relations Program and the International Policy Studies Program. He has published about early Cold War history, as well as about the history of nuclear weapons development and strategy during the 1940s and 1950s.

He received his PhD in history from Harvard University. He is on the board of advisors for the Center on Peace and Liberty at the Independent Institute.

Works
The Truman Administration: A Documentary History, New York, Harper & Row, 1966
Towards a New Past: Dissenting Essays in American History, New York, Pantheon Books, 1968
Twentieth-Century America: Recent Interpretations, New York: Harcourt, 1969
Politics and Policies of the Truman Administration, Quadrangle Books, 1970

References

External links
 Official Page at Stanford's Website
 Official Page at the Independent Institute

1936 births
Stanford University Department of History faculty
Living people
Harvard Graduate School of Arts and Sciences alumni
21st-century American historians
21st-century American male writers
Historians of nuclear weapons
American male non-fiction writers